Yana Urqu (Quechua yana black, urqu mountain, "black mountain", hispanicized spellings Yanaorcco, Yanaorco) is a mountain  in the Andes of Peru, about  high. It is located in the Cusco Region, Canas Province, Langui District, and in the Canchis Province, Marangani District. Yana Urqu lies on a ridge northeast of Langui Layo Lake, northwest of Pawka.

References

Mountains of Cusco Region
Mountains of Peru